The Ratchford Range is a subrange of the Monashee Mountains of the Columbia Mountains, located east of the Seymour River in British Columbia, Canada.

References

Ratchford Range in the Canadian Mountain Encyclopedia

Monashee Mountains